Other Voices is a Canadian current affairs television series which aired on CBC Television from 1964 to 1965.

Premise
Don Francks hosted this series which sought to feature groups who did not usually receive significant television coverage such as First Nations people living on reserve, youth in the British Mods and Rockers subcultures, and homosexuals ("Every Tenth Man"). The series also contained dramatic, musical or satirical sketches. The series also featured people such as author Wyndham Lewis, composer Charles Mingus, academic Marshall McLuhan, filmmaker Leni Riefenstahl, painter Frederick Varley and musician Joe Hill. Other Voices filled the current affairs void left by the cancellation of the previous season's Horizon.

Scheduling
This half-hour series was broadcast on Tuesdays at 10:30 p.m. (Eastern) in two runs, from 6 October to 29 December 1964, then 6 April to 29 June 1965.

Reception
The series attempted controversy, but an episode on cultural mediocrity drew criticism from one of its interview subjects, Gladys Taylor, who assumed the discussion was about the arts. Instead, when the programme aired, she unexpectedly found herself ridiculed as a "mediocrat".

References

External links
 
 

CBC Television original programming
1964 Canadian television series debuts
1965 Canadian television series endings
Black-and-white Canadian television shows